James Hamilton (1710 – August 14, 1783), son of the well-known American lawyer Andrew Hamilton, was a prominent lawyer and governmental figure in colonial Philadelphia and Pennsylvania. He served as Deputy Governor of the Province from 1748 to 1754, and again from 1759 to 1763.

Early life and education
Hamilton was born in Philadelphia in 1710, in what was then colonial-era Pennsylvania. He was educated in Philadelphia and England before becoming a practicing lawyer in 1731. On 28 December 1733, his father resigned as prothonotary of the Supreme Court of Pennsylvania, Hamilton was appointed to the office.

In May 1734, James's father Andrew Hamilton sold him the town site of Lancaster, Pennsylvania for 5 shillings. Later that month, on May 21, the younger Hamilton secured a patent from the Penn family for his grant on the Lancaster land.

After the death of his father on August 4, 1741, Hamilton inherited his 150-acre estate known as Bush Hill north of the city.  He assisted his brother-in-law William Allen in the administration of lands purchased by his father to be used for the state house and surrounding public space.

Hamilton was a member of the provincial assembly from 1735 to 1740. He served as mayor of Philadelphia for one year from October 1745. During his tenure as Mayor, Hamilton kept a record of servants and apprentices bound before him, which historians have used to gauge the nature and extent of indentured servitude in Philadelphia—and Pennsylvania more generally because Philadelphia was the entry-point for indentured servants coming into the colony from Europe.

Hamilton became a member of the provincial council in 1746. He was commissioned by the sons of William Penn as lieutenant-governor, as which he served until 1754, then again from 1759 to 1763, then briefly also in 1771 and 1773.

On September 13, 1761, Hamilton and William Allen conveyed Lot no. 1 and the other pieces of property obtained by Andrew Hamilton and Allen to Isaac Norris II and the other trustees in charge of purchasing property for the Philadelphia state house. The conveyance of this land completed the area of the Yard: property that contained the state house and the public spaces surrounding it.

During the period in which the federal capital was located in Philadelphia, Hamilton was on an extended stay in England. He rented Bush Hill to the government for the vice president to use as his residence.

Deputy Governor of the Province of Pennsylvania

Hamilton was visiting London in 1748, when he received the commission of Deputy Governor for the province from the Penns. Upon his return to Philadelphia, he was faced with some unrest from the Native American population.  Their territory north of the Blue Mountains (west of the Susquehanna River) was being encroached upon by settlers illegally. Hamilton authorized Richard Peters and Conrad Weiser to assist in removing these squatters after the provision in the Land Purchase of 1749, which authorized their removal by force if necessary.

Other issues Hamilton confronted included:
Encroachment of the French Military into forts in the land of the Pennsylvania Charter at Presque Isle, Venango, La Boeuf and Du Quesne.
Organizing and funding a defense (against the French) in opposition to the pacifist Quaker element in the Assembly
Friction between the Assembly and Proprietors on taxing Proprietary land holdings
Assembly discontent over the Proprietors' refusal to hear appeals from them about the Deputy Governor's decisions
Failure to disclose to the Assembly, the Proprietors' directive concerning the financial interest of pecuniary bills which Hamilton would approve
Albany Congress attended by John Penn and Benjamin Franklin, who proposed a colonial union for defense against the French and Indians

Hamilton resigned due to his deteriorating relations with the Assembly in the attempt to follow the Proprietors' instructions.

Hamilton's second turn as Deputy Governor followed the recall of William Denny.  The French and Indian War was coming to its conclusion. However, Pennsylvania was then facing Pontiac's War. Delaware and Shawnee raided deep into frontier Pennsylvania, taking captives and killing settlers. An uprising led by a vigilante group that came to be known as the Paxton Boys erupted in the colony. Hamilton was replaced by John Penn, William Penn's grandson.

President of Provincial Council
Hamilton assumed the role of chief executive from May 4 to October 16, 1771, when John Penn left Philadelphia to return to England when his father died. The council was prohibited to approve any act of the Assembly so the role was strictly ceremonial or administrative until October when Richard Penn, Jr., (John's brother) was appointed as the province's deputy governor. Hamilton acted as acting governor of the Pennsylvania Province from July 19 to August 30, 1773.

Death and legacy

Hamilton died in New York City on August 14, 1783.

He was active in founding several institutions in Philadelphia, serving as president of the board of trustees of the College of Philadelphia, which is now the University of Pennsylvania and as the head of the American Philosophical Society.

Since Hamilton did not have a surviving son, his nephew William Hamilton inherited his estate at Bush Hill. During the 1793 yellow fever epidemic, the Bush Hill estate was adapted for several months for use as a yellow fever hospital.

See also
List of colonial governors of Pennsylvania

References

External links
Biography at Temple University
Biographical sketch and portrait at the University of Pennsylvania

1710 births
1783 deaths
18th-century American politicians
Colonial governors of Pennsylvania
Mayors of Philadelphia
Members of the American Philosophical Society
Members of the Pennsylvania Provincial Assembly
Members of the Pennsylvania Provincial Council
Pennsylvania prothonotaries
People from Accomack County, Virginia
People of colonial Pennsylvania
University of Pennsylvania people